Toshkivka is an urban-type settlement in Sievierodonetsk Raion (district) in Luhansk Oblast of eastern Ukraine, at about 30 km WNW from the centre of Luhansk city. Population:

History 
On 12 June 2022, during the 2022 Russian invasion of Ukraine, Russian forces claimed to have seized control over the settlement. On 21 June, the Ukraine admitted that it had lost control over Toshkivka, claiming that it was only conquered on 20 June. The town has practically ceased to exist due to heavy bombing, which led to the destruction of all buildings in the settlement.

Demographics
Native language distribution as of the Ukrainian Census of 2001:
Ukrainian: 83.05%
Russian: 16.39%
 other languages: 0.56%

References

Urban-type settlements in Sievierodonetsk Raion